Empire: Wargame of the Century is a video game based on Empire developed by Walter Bright and published by Interstel Corporation in 1987.

Development

Walter Bright recoded the game Empire in C on an IBM PC. With low commercial expectations, he submitted an announcement to January 1984 BYTE magazine's "Software Received" section, and received a flood of orders. After writing to many software companies (including Broderbund, Sirius Software, Simon & Schuster, Sublogic, Epyx, and MicroProse), he licensed the game to a small software company named Interstel.  Mark Baldwin was brought in to coauthor the game redesigning it for the commercial market. Starting around 1987, Empire: Wargame of the Century on the Atari ST, Amiga, Commodore 64, Apple II, Macintosh, and DOS was produced.

Reception
In its review of the game, Computer Gaming World noted the improved UI, saying "the playability of an already successful system has been significantly enhanced". The game would later receive the magazine's "Game of the Year" award for 1988; in 1989 the magazine named Empire to its Hall of Fame for games readers rated highly over time, with a final score of 9.71 out of 12, in 1990 readers voted for the game as their "All-Time Favorite", a 1991 magazine survey of strategy and war games gave it four and a half stars out of five, and a 1993 survey in the magazine gave the game three stars out of five. Compute! agreed with the warning on the game box of its addictiveness, stating that the game combined aspects of exploration and strategy. The magazine also praised the UI, and concluded "this is a superb, addictive game". Jerry Pournelle of BYTE also agreed about its addictiveness. While stating that the UI could be improved, he noted that Empire avoided the need to micromanage units that made games like Anacreon: Reconstruction 4021 tedious. Pournelle concluded that Empire "tempts you to play a little longer and find out what's going to happen next". The Atari ST version of the game was reviewed in 1988 in Dragon #131 by Hartley, Patricia, and Kirk Lesser in "The Role of Computers" column. The reviewers gave the game 4 out of 5 stars. The Lessers reviewed the MS-DOS version of the game in 1989 in Dragon #142, and gave the game 4 out of 5 stars.

Reviews
ASM (Aktueller Software Markt) - Mar, 1988
ACE (Advanced Computer Entertainment) - Oct, 1988
Computer Gaming World - Nov, 1991

References

External links
Review in Antic
Review in Info
Review in Info
Review in Ahoy!'s Amiga User

1987 video games
Amiga games
Apple II games
Atari ST games
Commodore 64 games
Computer wargames
DOS games
Turn-based strategy video games
Video games based on board games
Video games developed in the United States